Metallus may refer to:
 Metallus (sawfly), insect genus in the family Tenthredinidae
 Metallus, unaccepted insect genus in the family Chrysomelidae, synonym of Taumacera
 Metallus, minor character from the animated television series Space Ghost Coast to Coast, see List of Space Ghost Coast to Coast characters#Minor